The Roman Catholic Archdiocese of Merauke is an archdiocese located in the city of Merauke in Indonesia.

History
 24 June 1950: Established as Apostolic Vicariate of Merauke from the Apostolic Vicariate of Amboina
 15 November 1966: Promoted as Metropolitan Archdiocese of Merauke

Leadership
 Archbishops of Merauke (Roman rite)
 Archbishop Nicolaus Adi Seputra, M.S.C. (7 April 2004 – 28 March 2020) 
 Archbishop Jacobus Duivenvoorde, M.S.C. (26 June 1972 – 30 April 2004)
 Archbishop Herman Tillemans, M.S.C. (15 November 1966 – 26 June 1972)
 Vicars Apostolic of Merauke (Roman Rite)
 Bishop Herman Tillemans, M.S.C. (later Archbishop) (25 June 1950 – 15 November 1966)

Suffragan dioceses
 Agats
 Jayapura
 Manokwari–Sorong
 Timika

References

Sources
 GCatholic.org
 Catholic Hierarchy

Roman Catholic dioceses in Indonesia
Christian organizations established in 1950
Roman Catholic dioceses and prelatures established in the 20th century
Merauke
1950 establishments in Indonesia